Khotachiwadi is a heritage village in Girgaon, Mumbai, India. Houses generally conform to the old-Portuguese style architecture.

It was founded in the late 18th century by Khot, a Pathare prabhu, who sold plots of land to local East Indian families. There used to be 65 of these houses, now reduced to 28 as old buildings are being pulled down to make way for new skyscrapers.

Architecture
Houses are made of wood, with a large open front verandah, a back courtyard and an external staircase to access the top bedroom.

Residents
Most of the residents now descend from the original inhabitants of Mumbai. Recently Gujarathis, Marwadis have moved into the area. Majority are Maharashtrain Christians.

References
Aati kya Kotachiwadi?, Times News Network, pg 7, Times of India, 2005-05-27
Minor Sights: Khotachiwadi Urban Village 2015-05-22

Neighbourhoods in Mumbai
Villages in Mumbai City district